Adalby Shkhagoshev (June 6, 1967, Trubchevsk, Bryansk Oblast) is a Russian political figure and deputy of the 5th, 6th, 7th, and 8th State Dumas. 

In 1991, Shkhagoshev started working as a senior detective of the Department for Combating Organized Crime of the Ministry of Internal Affairs of Kabardino-Balkaria. On October 1, 1992, Shkhagoshev lost both hands during the operation to free a hostage. After the incident, he received the Order "For Personal Courage". From 1993 to 2001, Shkhagoshev served as deputy of the Parliament of the Kabardino-Balkarian Republic of the 1st and 2nd convocations. On December 2, 2007, he was elected deputy of the 5th State Duma. In 2011, 2016, and 2021, he was re-elected for the 6th, 7th, and 8th State Dumas.

References

1967 births
Living people
United Russia politicians
21st-century Russian politicians
Eighth convocation members of the State Duma (Russian Federation)
Seventh convocation members of the State Duma (Russian Federation)
Sixth convocation members of the State Duma (Russian Federation)
Fifth convocation members of the State Duma (Russian Federation)